Lin Hsiang-nung (born 1936) is a Taiwanese politician and diplomat.

Early life and education
Lin was born in 1936. A native of Kaohsiung, he attended National Chengchi University and Chinese Culture University.

Political career
Lin worked for the Ministry of Foreign Affairs for 25 years, and was based in Latin America. He also served as secretary to Lien Chan before assuming a vice-ministerial role at the Council of Agriculture in 1989. Lin was promoted in 1999 to succeed Peng Tso-kwei as agriculture minister. Upon taking office, Lin expressed support for revisions to the Agricultural Development Law proposed by Peng. However, shortly afterward, Lin proposed a new set of regulations regarding the zoning of farmland. The Legislative Yuan eventually voted to allow individual farmers to build structures on newly-acquired farmland. Shortly before leaving the Council of Agriculture, Lin joined Lien Chan's 2000 presidential campaign. He stepped down when the Chen Shui-bian administration was sworn into office and later worked for the National Policy Foundation, a Kuomintang think tank. By the 2004 election cycle, Lin had been named the leader of the Kuomintang's Kaohsiung headquarters and worked to coordinate a joint presidential ticket with the People First Party. After Chen Shui-bian won a second presidential term, Lin led a protest outside the Kaohsiung District Prosecutors' Office. He sought agricultural support for the KMT in the 2005 local elections by organizing the Taiwan Tractor Team.

References

1936 births
Living people
Politicians of the Republic of China on Taiwan from Kaohsiung
Diplomats of the Republic of China
Chinese Culture University alumni
National Chengchi University alumni
Taiwanese Ministers of Agriculture